Iron Gustav (German: Der eiserne Gustav) is a 1958 West German comedy film directed by George Hurdalek and starring Heinz Rühmann, Lucie Mannheim and Karin Baal. It is based on the real story of cab driver Gustav Hartmann who drove his droshky from Berlin to Paris. The story was later made into a television series of the same title in the 1970s.

In was shot at the Tempelhof Studios in West Berlin with location shooting in the city as well as Cologne and Paris. The film's sets were designed by the art directors Hans Berthel and Karl Schneider.

Cast
Heinz Rühmann as Gustav Hartmann
Lucie Mannheim as Frau Marie Hartmann
Ernst Schröder as Friedrich Karl Möbius
Karin Baal as Anni Hartmann
Ingrid van Bergen as Gertrud Hartmann
Ruth Nimbach as Frau Johanna Möbius
Ludwig Linkmann as Paulchen Klinke
Lutz Moik as Otto Kroppke
Hilde Sessak as Frau Vietzke
Willi Rose as Otto Vietzke
Bruno Fritz as Amtsarzt
Harry Meyen as Assessor

References

Bibliography
Bock, Hans-Michael & Bergfelder, Tim. The Concise CineGraph. Encyclopedia of German Cinema. Berghahn Books, 2009.

External links

1958 comedy films
German comedy films
West German films
Films directed by George Hurdalek
Films set in 1928
Comedy films based on actual events
Films about horses
Films set in Berlin
Films shot in Berlin
Films set in Paris
Films shot in Paris
Films shot at Tempelhof Studios
1950s German films
1950s German-language films
Adaptations of works by Hans Fallada